Sons of Rizk is a 2015 Egyptian action film directed by Tarek Al Eryan.

Cast 
 Ahmed Ezz - Reda Rizk
 Amr Youssef - Rabia' Rizk
 Karim Kassem - Ramadan Rizk 
 Ahmed Dawood - Ragab Rizk
 Ahmed Al Fishawy - Atef

References

External links 

2015 action films
Egyptian action films